Adolph Munch (1829 – 1901) was an American politician and businessman.

Born in Prussia, Munch was a merchant in Pine City, Minnesota. He served in the Minnesota House of Representatives in 1872.

Notes

1829 births
1901 deaths
People from Pine City, Minnesota
People from the Kingdom of Prussia
Businesspeople from Minnesota
Members of the Minnesota House of Representatives
19th-century American politicians
19th-century American businesspeople